Exotic Creatures of the Deep is the 21st album by the American rock band Sparks.

Release
Exotic Creatures of the Deep was as successful as their previous album, Hello Young Lovers, in the UK, where it bettered the chart position, reaching No. 54 on the UK Album Chart. A limited edition version was released in a card sleeve in most territories and included a poster. Japanese editions included the bonus track "Brenda Is Always in the Way" as well as a DVD featuring five short films.

Two singles were released. The first, "Good Morning" on May 12, 2008, was on iTunes, a first for the group. The second, "Lighten Up, Morrissey" in March 2009, appeared on a 7", backed with "Brenda Is Always In The Way". Neither single charted in the UK.

Exotic Creatures of the Deep was also promoted in the UK by a number of live performances dubbed the "Sparks Spectacular": a record-setting twenty-date residency from May 16 through June 11, 2008 at London's Carling Islington Academy, where the group played each one of their previous twenty albums in its entirety in chronological order. The final appearance at London's Shepherd's Bush Empire on June 13 premièred Exotic Creatures of the Deep.

Re-release 
In April 2022, a remaster was issued on LP, CD and digital as part of the five album "21st Century Sparks" collection on BMG. The CD and digital releases have five bonus tracks, including "Brenda Is Always In The Way" and "Islington N1". 

It entered the UK Independent Albums Chart at no. 10 and the UK Vinyl Album Top 40 at 37.

Track listing

Personnel
 Russell Mael – all vocals, engineering, mixing
 Ron Mael – keyboards, programming, orchestrations, mixing
 Tammy Glover – drums
 Dean Menta – guitars
 John Thomas – mixing, engineering

Sparks Spectacular
For the 21-night "Sparks Spectacular" from May 16 through June 11, 2008 in London, Sparks played each of their albums in chronological order during the first twenty nights at the Carling Islington Academy, culminating in the première of their new album for the twenty-first concert on June 13, 2008 at Shepherd's Bush Empire. Each night they performed an album in its entirety with an encore of a rare track, many of which had never been performed live before. The band asked fans to visit their website and vote for the track that they'd most like to hear the band perform during the second half of the 21st concert following the première of Exotic Creatures of the Deep, though Russell Mael admitted that he and Ron would probably influence the poll a little.

Fans who bought a "Golden Ticket" for entry into all 21 gigs also received a poster signed by the band and a CD single entitled Islington N1, a reference to the postal address of the venue for the first 20 gigs.

Exotic Creatures of the Deep second set
 "Moustache" (from Angst in My Pants)
 "Looks Aren't Everything"
 "Big Boy" (from Big Beat)
 "Goofing Off" (from Introducing Sparks)
 "Katharine Hepburn"
 "Shopping Mall Of Love" (from Music You Can Dance To)
 "Those Mysteries" (from Introducing Sparks)
 "Dick Around" (from Hello Young Lovers)
 "Get in the Swing" (from Indiscreet)
 "Looks, Looks, Looks" (from Indiscreet)
 "Batteries Not Included" (from A Woofer in Tweeter's Clothing)
 "Whippings And Apologies" (from A Woofer in Tweeter's Clothing)
 "Change" (from Music That You Can Dance To)
 "This Town Ain't Big Enough For Both Of Us" (from Kimono My House)

Charts

References 

2008 albums
Sparks (band) albums
Albums recorded in a home studio